VE-NILANGAL is a Venezuelan multipurpose rocket launcher created by a contract signed for Pequiven and FAN.

Specifications
Caliber: 72mm.

External links
 http://news.webshots.com/photo/2601310630045368369OMJrJG

Rocket artillery
Military equipment of Venezuela